Takshashila Campus is one of the two campuses of Devi Ahilya University, Indore (the other being Nalanda Campus). While Nalanda Campus hosts the administrative offices of the university, Takshashila Campus was created to provide space for more departments.

Infrastructure
The campus sprawls over a 200 acres. Separated by a National Highway, it is further divided into three portions. On one of these portions School of Pharmacy, DAVV is built, while the other has the Institute of Engineering Technology. The major portion has about 28 departments of the university.

The Takshashila Campus hosts the following departments/institutes/schools:

Academic Staff College
Center of Potential of Excellence in e-Management studies
Department of Life Long Learning
Educational Multimedia Research Centre
Institute of Management Studies
International Institute of Professional Studies
Institute of Engineering and Technology
Department of Computer Engineering
Department of Information Technology
Electronics and Telecommunication/Instrumentation Department
Applied Science Department
Mechanical Engineering
School of Biotechnology
School of Biochemistry
School of Chemical Sciences
School of Commerce
School of Computer Science & Information Technology and Computer Centre
School of Economics
School of Education
School of Electronics
School of Energy and Environmental Studies
School of Future Studies and Planning
School of Instrumentation
School of Journalism & Mass Communication
School of Law
School of Library Sciences
School of Life Sciences
School of Mathematics
School of Pharmacy
School of Physical Education
School of Physics
School of Social Sciences
School of Statistics
University Central Library
University Cultural Center

It also hosts facilities like
Central Auditorium
Central Library
University IT Center
University Health Center
Indian Coffee House (privately run by ICWS Jabalpur)
University Post office
Jawaharlal Nehru Boys Hostel

The campus has extensions that host hostel facilities for students and guests.

Universities and colleges in Indore